Julie Dreyfus (born 24 January 1966) is a French actress who is well known in Japan where she made her television debut on a French language lesson program on NHK's educational channel in the late 1980s. She has appeared on the TV show Ryōri no Tetsujin (Iron Chef) as a guest and judge. She is best known to western audiences for her appearances in the Quentin Tarantino films Kill Bill: Volume 1 and Inglourious Basterds, in which she played Sofie Fatale and Francesca Mondino respectively. Aside from her native French she is fluent in English and Japanese.

Early life
Dreyfus was born and raised in Paris, the only child of actress Pascale Audret and producer Francis Dreyfus. Her father was of Romanian-Jewish and Alsatian-Jewish ancestry, and her mother was of French descent. She spent her summers in the UK. As a child she used to watch Woody Allen's early movies together with her mother. She started learning Japanese in 1985 at the Institute for Oriental Languages and Civilization at the University of Paris, after studying interior design and becoming interested in Japanese architecture. She moved to Japan to study at the Osaka University of Foreign Studies for a six-month, intensive Japanese course, thinking that she would eventually land a job in interior design. After finishing the course, she moved to Tokyo working part-time in a design studio while continuing her private Japanese lessons. In 1988, she worked as a French language instructor on the NHK morning-television-educational program. Centering on a mystery drama, chief producer Motoyoshi Sei hired Dreyfus to increase ratings by changing the program into an episode format. Eventually, she was cast by Japanese network executives as the twenty-something beauty in several TV and film roles, leading her to become a gaijin tarento (foreign talent). She was also a judge on the cult-hit cooking show Ryōri no Tetsujin (Iron Chef).

Film career
Dreyfus portrayed the character of Sofie Fatale in Quentin Tarantino's 2003 film, Kill Bill Volume 1. She was a member of the 2007 Gérardmer Film Festival (Festival international du film fantastique de Gérardmer), which honored her Kill Bill co-star David Carradine.

Dreyfus appeared in Vinyan in 2008 and in Tarantino's war epic Inglourious Basterds in 2009, as Francesca Mondino, a fictional French interpreter and mistress for Nazi propagandist Joseph Goebbels.  She also appeared as a translator in the Leos Carax short film entitled Merde in the feature film Tokyo!

Filmography

References

External links

 

1966 births
Living people
Actresses from Paris
French expatriates in Japan
French film actresses
French Ashkenazi Jews
French people of Romanian-Jewish descent
French people of Jewish descent
Expatriate television personalities in Japan
Outstanding Performance by a Cast in a Motion Picture Screen Actors Guild Award winners
20th-century French actresses
21st-century French actresses